Oregon Route 131 (OR 131), known as the Netarts Highway No. 131 (see Oregon highways and routes), is a state highway in the U.S. state of Oregon. The route runs from the coastal community of Oceanside to an intersection with U.S. Route 101 (US 101) and OR 6 in Tillamook, Oregon. Netarts Highway No. 131 was established in 1940, and was designated OR 131 in 2002.

Route description

The western terminus of OR 131 is in the town of Oceanside, located in between Cape Meares and Cape Lookout in Tillamook County. From there, the highway heads south through Netarts, and then heads east. The highway then turns north, finally turning east before it ends in downtown Tillamook, at an intersection with US 101 and OR 6.

The stretch of the highway between Oceanside, and an intersection south of Netarts, is part of the Three Capes Scenic Route, as is the easternmost stretch of the highway approaching Tillamook.

History
The Netarts Highway No. 131 was established as a secondary highway on November 13, 1940. On September 19, 2002, OR 131 was assigned to the Netarts Highway.

Major intersections

References

2002 establishments in Oregon
131
Transportation in Tillamook County, Oregon